The Deep River Formation is a geologic formation in Montana. It preserves fossils dating back to the Neogene period.

Fauna

See also

 List of fossiliferous stratigraphic units in Montana
 Paleontology in Montana

References

 

Neogene Montana